The Women's 10 km Open Water event at the 2010 South American Games was held on March 25 at 9:10.

Medalists

Results

References
Report

Open Water 10m W